Nakili Manishi ( Fake Guy) is a 1980 Telugu-language film. This movie starred Chiranjeevi, in a dual role, Sangeeta, Suneeta and Satyanarayana. This film released on 1 August 1980.

Plot 
Prasad (Chiranjeevi), a middle-class man, loses his job due to his honesty. Unable to get a job and to have to feed his family, he agrees to die for the money. Rama (Suneeta), who hires him to die, pays money for it. But in the last minute, Prasad wants to live, and with the help of Gangaraju (Satyanarayana), he hides in a safe place. Shyam (Chiranjeevi), a look-alike of Prasad, is a crook who murders Gangadhar Rao with the help of Rama for the property and hides the money. Susheela (Kavitha), who is in love with Shyam, sees the murder and loses her sanity. Susheela is a sister of Gangaraju. Rama wants to plan the murder of Prasad in an accident so that Shyam can roam freely in the name of Prasad. But the plan backfires and how Shyam and Rama end up and how Gangaraju and Prasad take revenge is the rest of the story.

Cast
 Chiranjeevi... Prasad & Shyam [dual roles]
 Sangeeta
 Suneetha
 Jayamalini
 Kaikala Satyanarayana
 M. Prabhakar Reddy... guest role
 Rajanala... guest role

Production Companies
 Production Company: Ravichitra Films
 Outdoor Unit: Sarada Enterprises & The Modern Theaters Limited
 Sound Processing: R.K. Film Laboratories
 Studios: AVM Studios, Murugan Movietone & Arunachalam Studios
 Color Processing: Prasad Film Laboratory

External links

1980 films
1980s Telugu-language films
Films scored by Satyam (composer)
Indian action thriller films
Films based on Indian novels
1980 action thriller films